Hendrik Frensch Verwoerd (8 September 1901 – 6 September 1966), also known as H. F. Verwoerd was a South African politician, a scholar of applied psychology and sociology, and chief editor of Die Transvaler newspaper. He is commonly regarded as the architect of Apartheid. Verwoerd played a significant role in socially engineering apartheid, the country's system of institutionalized racial segregation and white supremacy, and implementing its policies as Minister of Native Affairs (1950–1958) and then as prime minister (1958–1966). Furthermore, Verwoerd played a vital role in helping the far-right National Party come to power in 1948, serving as their political strategist and propagandist, becoming party leader upon his premiership. He was the Union of South Africa's last prime minister, from 1958 to 1961, when he proclaimed the founding of the Republic of South Africa, remaining its prime minister until his assassination in 1966.

Verwoerd was an authoritarian, socially conservative leader and an Afrikaner nationalist. He was a member of the Afrikaner Broederbond (Afrikaans: Brotherhood), a secret white and Calvinist organization dedicated to advancing the Afrikaner "volk" interests, and protested against South Africa's declaration of war on Germany during World War II. Following the Nationalist electoral victory in 1948, Verwoerd assumed high positions in the government and wielded a strong influence on South African society.

Verwoerd became prime minister in 1958. His desire to ensure white, and especially Afrikaner dominance in South Africa, to the exclusion of the nonwhite majority, was a major aspect of his support for a republic. To that same end, Verwoerd greatly expanded apartheid. When attempting to justify apartheid to international audiences, he branded it as a policy of "good-neighborliness", stating that as different races and cultures have different beliefs and values, they could only reach their full potential if they lived and developed apart from each other. He stated that the white minority had to be protected from the nonwhite majority by pursuing a "policy of separate development" and keeping power in the hands of whites.  Apartheid saw the complete disfranchisement of the nonwhite population.

Verwoerd heavily repressed opposition to apartheid during his premiership. He ordered the detention and imprisonment of tens of thousands of people and the exile of further thousands, while at the same time greatly empowering, modernizing, and enlarging the white apartheid state's security forces (police and military). He banned black organizations such as the African National Congress and the Pan Africanist Congress, and it was under him that future president Nelson Mandela was imprisoned for life for sabotage. Verwoerd's South Africa had one of the highest prison populations in the world and saw a large number of executions and floggings. By the mid-1960s Verwoerd's government to a large degree had put down internal civil resistance to apartheid by employing extraordinary legislative power, draconian laws, psychological intimidation, and the relentless efforts of the white state's security apparatus. 

His actions prompted the passing of United Nations General Assembly Resolution 1761, condemning apartheid, and ultimately leading to South Africa's international isolation and economic sanctions. On 6 September 1966, Verwoerd was stabbed several times by parliamentary aide Dimitri Tsafendas. He died shortly after, and Tsafendas was jailed until his death in 1999.

Early life 

Hendrik Verwoerd was born in Amsterdam in the Netherlands in 1901. Verwoerd was South Africa's only foreign-born prime minister. He was the second child of Anje Strik and Wilhelmus Johannes Verwoerd. His father was a shopkeeper and a deeply religious man who decided to move his family to South Africa in 1903 because of his sympathy towards the Afrikaner nation in the wake of the Second Boer War. Verwoerd went to a Lutheran primary school in Wynberg, Cape Town. By the end of 1912, the Verwoerd family moved to Bulawayo, Rhodesia, where his father became an assistant evangelist in the Dutch Reformed Church. Verwoerd attended Milton High School where he was awarded the Beit Scholarship, established by diamond magnate and financier Alfred Beit. Verwoerd received the top marks for English literature in Rhodesia.

In 1917, the family moved back to South Africa since the congregation in Bulawayo had appointed a second minister of religion. His father took up a position in the church in Brandfort, Orange Free State. Due to the worldwide Spanish flu epidemic, the younger Verwoerd only sat for his matriculation exams in February 1919, achieving first position in the Orange Free State and fifth in country.

Verwoerd studied at Stellenbosch University, where he was regarded as a brilliant social science academic, and it was widely claimed that he possessed a photographic memory. Verwoerd was fluent in Afrikaans, Dutch, English and German. He obtained his B.A with distinctions in Sociology, Psychology and Philosophy, and then completed his Masters cum laude. He then went on completing his Doctorate in Psychology in 1925 at Stellenbosch University. Verwoerd's over three hundred page Doctorate thesis titled "Die Afstomping van die Gemoedsaandoeninge" (Afrikaans: The numbing of the Emotion) was at the time regarded as a monumental academic achievement in field of Applied Psychology in South Africa.

Due to the work undertaken by Verwoerd in his doctoral thesis , he was awarded two scholarships for post-doctoral research abroad—one by the Abe Bailey Trust to study at the University of Oxford, England, and another one to continue his studies in Germany. He opted for the latter, as Verwoerd wanted to continue his research under a number of renowned German psychology and philosophy professors of the time, and possibly due to his own anti-British views at the time.  Verwoerd left for Germany in 1926, and proceeded to research psychology and sociology at the University of Hamburg, Berlin, and Leipzig. In Hamburg he studied under William Stern, in Berlin under Wolfgang Köhler and Otto Lipmann, and in Leipzig under Felix Krueger. Most of these professors were not allowed to teach anymore once the Nazis came to power in 1933.. Claims that Verwoerd studied eugenics during his German sojourn and later based his apartheid policy on Nazi ideology, are still being evaluated by scholars. Critics contend that eugenics was usually taught at medical faculties during this period. Christoph Marx asserts that Verwoerd kept a conspicuous distance from eugenic theories and racist social technologies, emphasising environmental influences rather than hereditary abilities.

Verwoerd's fiancée, Betsie Schoombie, joined him in Germany and they were married in Hamburg on 7 January 1927. Later that year, he continued his studies in the United Kingdom, and then proceeded to the United States. His lecture notes and memoranda at Stellenbosch University stressed that there were no biological differences between the big racial groups, and concluded that "this was not really a factor in the development of a higher social civilization by the Caucasians."

Return to South Africa 

Verwoerd returned with his wife to South Africa in 1928 and was appointed to the chair of Applied Psychology and Psycho Technique at the University of Stellenbosch where, six years later, he became Professor of Sociology and Social Work. During the Great Depression, Verwoerd became active in social work among poor white South Africans. He devoted much attention to welfare work and was often consulted by welfare organizations, while he served on numerous committees.

Afrikaans politics from 1910 to 1948 were divided between the "liberals" such as Jan Smuts who argued for a reconciliation with Britain vs. the "extremists" who expressed anti-British sentiments due to the Boer War. Both the "liberals" and the "extremists" believed that South Africa was a "white man's country", though the latter were more stridently committed to white supremacy. Verwoerd belonged to the anti-British faction in Afrikaans politics who wanted to keep as much distance as possible from Britain.

In 1936, Verwoerd joined by a group of Stellenbosch University professors protested against the immigration of German Jews to South Africa, who were fleeing Nazi persecution. His efforts in the field of national welfare drew him into politics and in 1936 he was offered the first editorship of Die Transvaler, a position which he took up in 1937, with the added responsibility of helping to rebuild the National Party in the Transvaal.

Die Transvaler was a publication which supported the aspirations of Afrikaner nationalism, agricultural and labour rights. Combining republicanism, populism and protectionism, the paper helped "solidify the sentiments of most South Africans, that changes to the socio-economic system were vitally needed". With the start of the Second World War in September 1939, Verwoerd protested against South Africa's role in the conflict when the country declared war on Germany, siding with its former colonial power, the United Kingdom.

In 1943, Verwoerd, editor of Die Transvaler, sued the English-language newspaper The Star after it accused him of being a Nazi propagandist. In his judgment dismissing the case, Justice Mallin stated that Verwoerd 'did support Nazi propaganda, he did make his paper a tool of Nazis in South Africa, and he knew it' (cited by Scheub 2010, 42; Bunting 1964, 106–107).

Government service

The South African general election of 1948 was held on 26 May 1948 and saw the Nationalist Party together with the Afrikaner Party winning the general elections. Malan's Herenigde Nasionale Party (HNP) concluded an election pact with the Afrikaner Party in 1947. They won the elections with a very narrow majority of five seats in Parliament, although they only got 40 percent of the voter support. This was due to the loaded constituencies in cities, which was to the advantage of rural constituencies. The nine Afrikaner Party MPs thus made it possible for Malan's HNP to form a coalition government with the Afrikaner Party of Klasie Havenga. The two parties amalgamated in 1951 as the National Party, although Havenga was not comfortable with NP policy to remove coloured voters from the common voters' roll.

Running on the platform of self-determination and apartheid as it was termed for the first time, Prime Minister Daniel Malan and his party benefited from their support in the rural electorates, defeating General Jan Christiaan Smuts and his United Party. General Smuts lost his own seat of Standerton. Most party leaders agreed that the nationalist policies were responsible for the National Party's victory. To further cement their nationalist policies, Herenigde Nasionale Party leader Daniel Malan called for stricter enforcement of job reservation protecting the rights of the white working class, and the rights of white workers to organise their own labour unions outside of company control.

Verwoerd was elected to the Senate of South Africa later that year, and became the minister of native affairs under Prime Minister Malan in 1950, until his appointment as prime minister in 1958. In that position, he helped to implement the Nationalist Party's programme.

Among the laws that were drawn and enacted during Verwoerd's time as minister for native affairs were the Population Registration Act and the Group Areas Act in 1950, the Pass Laws Act of 1952 and the Reservation of Separate Amenities Act of 1953. Verwoerd wrote the Bantu Education Act, which was to have a deleterious effect on the ability of black South Africans to be educated. Verwoerd himself noted that the purpose of the Bantu Education Act was to ensure that blacks would have only just enough education to work as unskilled laborers.

The Bantu Education Act ensured that black South Africans had only the barest minimal of education, thus entrenching the role of blacks in the apartheid economy as a cheap source of unskilled labor. In June 1954, Verwoerd in a speech stated: "The Bantu must be guided to serve his own community in all respects. There is no place for him in the European community above the level of certain forms of labour. Within his own community, however, all doors are open".

One black South African woman who worked as an anti-apartheid activist, Nomavenda Mathiane, in particular criticized Verwoerd for the Bantu Education Act of 1953, which caused generations of black South Africans to suffer an inferior education, saying: "After white people had taken the land, after white people had impoverished us in South Africa, the only way out of our poverty was through education. And he came up with the idea of giving us an inferior education."

Prime minister

Prime Minister Daniel Malan announced his retirement from politics following the National Party's success in the elections of 1953. In the succession debate that followed Malan's retirement in 1954, N. C. Havenga, and J. G. Strijdom were potential successors. The Young Turks of the Transvaal got the upper hand and thus J. G. Strijdom was elected as the new leader of the National Party, who succeeded Malan as Prime Minister.

Verwoerd gradually gained popularity with the Afrikaner electorate and continued to expand his political support. With his overwhelming constituency victory in the 1958 election and the death shortly thereafter of Prime Minister J. G. Strijdom, Verwoerd was nominated together with Eben Dönges and C. R. Swart from the Orange Free State as candidates to head the party. Verwoerd got the most votes in the second round and thus succeeded Strijdom as Prime Minister.

Apartheid

Hendrik Verwoerd is often called the architect of apartheid for his role in shaping the implementation of apartheid policy when he was minister of native affairs and then prime minister. Verwoerd once described apartheid as a "policy of good neighbourliness".

At the time that the NP came to power in 1948, there were factional differences in the party about the implementation of systemic racial segregation. The larger  faction, favoured segregation, but also favoured the participation of black Africans in the economy as long as black labour could be controlled to advance the economic gains of Afrikaners. A second faction were the "purists", who believed in "vertical segregation", in which blacks and whites would be entirely separated, with blacks living in native reserves, with separate political and economic structures, which, they believed, would entail severe short-term pain, but would also lead to independence of white South Africa from black labour in the long-term. Verwoerd belonged to a third faction, that sympathised with the purists, but allowed for the use of black labour, while implementing the purist goal of vertical separation.

Verwoerd's vision of a South Africa divided into multiple ethno-states appealed to the reform-minded Afrikaner intelligentsia, and it provided a more coherent philosophical and moral framework for the National Party's racist policies, while also providing a veneer of intellectual respectability to the previously crude policy of baasskap. Verwoerd felt that the political situation of South Africa had become stagnant over the past century and called for reform.

Under the Premiership of Verwoerd, the following legislative acts relating to apartheid were introduced:

 Promotion of Bantu Self-government Act, 1959
 Bantu Investment Corporation Act, 1959
 Extension of University Education Act, 1959

Republic

The creation of a republic was one of the National Party's long-term goals since originally coming to power in 1948. In January 1960, Verwoerd announced that a referendum would be called to determine the republican issue, the objective being a republic within the Commonwealth. Two weeks later, Harold Macmillan, then British Prime Minister, visited South Africa.

In an address to both Houses of Parliament, Macmillan gave his famous Winds of Change speech. The speech, which implicitly criticized apartheid, together with the worldwide criticism following the Sharpeville massacre, created a siege mentality in South Africa. Verwoerd seized upon this to booster his case for a republic, presenting Elizabeth II as the ruler of a hostile power.

Verwoerd also ensured that South African media gave generous coverage of the breakdown of society in the Congo in the summer of 1960 following independence from Belgium as an example of the sort of "horrors" that allegedly would ensue in South Africa if apartheid was ended. He then linked the Congo situation to the criticism of apartheid in Britain, arguing the Congolese "horrors" were what the British government was intent upon inflicting on white South Africans (via their opposition to apartheid), fanning the flames of Anglophobia.

In order to bolster support for a republic, the voting age for whites was lowered from 21 to 18, benefiting younger Afrikaans speakers, who were more likely to favour a republic, and the franchise was extended to whites in South-West Africa, most of whom were German or Afrikaans speakers. This was done even though English South Africans were slightly outnumbered by Afrikaners. The vast majority of English South Africans were against South Africa becoming a republic and were still loyal to the British Crown, especially in Natal, where anti-republican and secessionist sentiment was very strong.

The 1960 South Africa referendum was accepted by Parliament. In March 1961 at the 1961 Commonwealth Prime Ministers' Conference in London, Verwoerd abandoned an attempt for South Africa to become a republic within the Commonwealth, which was necessary given the intention to declare a republic following a resolution jointly sponsored by Jawaharlal Nehru of India and John Diefenbaker of Canada declaring that racism was incompatible with Commonwealth membership. Verwoerd abandoned the application to rejoin the Commonwealth after the Indo-Canadian resolution was accepted mostly by votes from non-white nations (Canada was the only majority white country to vote for the resolution), and stormed out of the conference. For many white South Africans, especially those of British extraction, leaving the Commonwealth imposed a certain psychological sense of isolation as South Africa left a club that it had belonged to since 1910 and of which it had been a prominent member. The Republic of South Africa came into existence on 31 May 1961, the anniversary of the signing of the Treaty of Vereeniging that had brought the Second Boer War to an end in 1902, and the establishment of the Union of South Africa in 1910. The Anglophobic Verwoerd timed the declaration of a republic with the anniversary of the Treaty of Vereeniging as a form of revenge for the defeat of the Transvaal Republic and the Orange Free State in the Boer War. The last Governor-General, Charles Robberts Swart, took office as the first State President.

After South Africa became a republic, Verwoerd refused to accept black ambassadors from Commonwealth member states. Verwoerd's overt moves to block non-whites from representing South Africa in sports—starting with cricket—started the international movement to ostracise South Africa from international sporting competition. Their last Olympic Games—until the abolition of apartheid—was in 1960, South Africa was expelled from FIFA in 1976, and whenever South African teams did participate in sports, protests and disruptions were the result. When supporters of South Africa decried their exclusion, the usual response was: "Who started it?", in reference to Verwoerd.

First assassination attempt 

On 9 April 1960, Verwoerd opened the Union Exposition in Milner Park, Johannesburg, to mark the jubilee of the Union of South Africa. After Verwoerd delivered his opening address, David Pratt, a rich English businessman and farmer from the Magaliesberg, near Pretoria, attempted to assassinate Verwoerd, firing two shots from a .22 pistol at point-blank range, one bullet perforating Verwoerd's right cheek and the second his right ear.

Colonel G. M. Harrison, president of the Witwatersrand Agricultural Society, leapt up and knocked the pistol from the gunman's hand. After the pistol fell to the floor, Harrison, with the help of Major Carl Richter, the Prime Minister's personal bodyguard, civilians and another policeman overpowered the gunman. He was taken to the Marshall Square police station and later transferred to the Forensic Medical Laboratory due to his peculiar behaviour.

Within minutes of the assassination attempt, Verwoerd—still conscious and blood gushing from his face—was rushed to the nearby Johannesburg Hospital. Two days later, the hospital issued a statement which described his condition as 'indeed satisfactory—further examinations were carried out today and they confirm good expectations. Dr. Verwoerd at present is restful. There is no need for any immediate operation.' Once his condition stabilised, Verwoerd was transferred to a Pretoria hospital. The neurologists who treated Verwoerd later stated that his escape had been 'absolutely miraculous'. Specialist surgeons were called in to remove the bullets. At first, there was speculation that Verwoerd would lose his hearing and sense of balance, but this was to prove groundless. He returned to public life on 29 May, less than two months after the shooting.

David Pratt was initially held under the emergency regulations, declared on 30 March 1960, nine days after the Sharpeville massacre and shortly after Verwoerd received a death threat with a red note reading, "Today we kill Verwoerd". Pratt appeared for a preliminary hearing in the Johannesburg Magistrates' Court on 20 and 21 July 1960, once it was clear that the attempt was not fatal.

Pratt claimed he had been shooting 'the epitome of apartheid'. However, in his defence, he stated he only wanted to injure, not kill, Verwoerd. The court accepted the medical reports submitted to it by five different psychiatrists, all of which confirmed that Pratt lacked legal capacity and could not be held criminally liable for having shot the prime minister. On 26 September 1960, he was committed to a mental hospital in Bloemfontein. On 1 October 1961, his 53rd birthday, he committed suicide, shortly before parole was to be considered. His cause of death is disputed, since many suicides during the apartheid era were actually murders and killings by police.

Solidifying the system 

In 1961, UN Secretary-General Dag Hammarskjöld visited South Africa where he could not reach an agreement with Prime Minister Verwoerd. On 6 November 1962, the United Nations General Assembly passed Resolution 1761, condemning South African apartheid policies. On 7 August 1963, the United Nations Security Council passed Resolution 181 calling for a voluntary arms embargo against South Africa, and in the same year, a Special Committee Against Apartheid was established to encourage and oversee plans of action against the authorities.

From 1964, the US and UK discontinued their arms trade with South Africa. Economic sanctions against South Africa were also frequently debated in the UN as an effective way of putting pressure on the apartheid government. In 1962, the UN General Assembly requested that its members sever political, fiscal and transportation ties with South Africa.

1966 general elections 

The National Party under Verwoerd won the 1966 general election. The election marked a major strengthening of power for the ruling NP, which gained a two-thirds majority in parliament for the first time. During this period, the National Party government continued to foster the development of a military industrial complex, that successfully pioneered developments in native armaments manufacturing, including aircraft, small arms, armoured vehicles, and even nuclear and biological weapons.

Three days before his death, Verwoerd had held talks with the Prime Minister of Lesotho, Chief Leabua Jonathan, at the Union Buildings in Pretoria. Following the meeting, a joint communique was issued by the two governments with special emphasis on "co-operation without interference in each others' internal affairs".

Assassination 

On 6 September 1966, Verwoerd was assassinated in Cape Town, shortly after entering the House of Assembly at 14:15. A uniformed parliamentary messenger named Dimitri Tsafendas stabbed Verwoerd in the neck and chest four times before being subdued by other members of the Assembly. Four members of Parliament who were also trained doctors rushed to the aid of Verwoerd and started administering cardiopulmonary resuscitation. Verwoerd was rushed to Groote Schuur Hospital, but was pronounced dead upon arrival.

Verwoerd's state funeral, attended by a quarter of a million people, was held in Pretoria on 10 September 1966, during which his South African flag-draped casket was laid on an artillery carriage towed by a military truck. He was buried in the Heroes' Acre in Pretoria. The still blood-stained carpet where Verwoerd lay after his murder remained in Parliament until it was removed in 2004.

Over the days that followed the assassination, Tsafendas was questioned by the police while in custody, while the police turned every possible stone in order to obtain as much information as possible. Under questioning, Tsafendas made coherent statements explaining that he had committed his act in the hope that after Verwoerd's "disappearance" "a change of policy would take place". He added that he "I wanted to see a government representing all the South African people. I do not think the Nationalist Government is representative of the people and I wanted to see a different government … I did not care about the consequences, for what would happen to me afterwards. I didn't care much and didn't give it a second thought that I would be caught. I was so disgusted with the racial policy that I went through with my plans to kill the prime minister."

At the same time, the South African police gathered a plethora of evidence of Tsafendas's long history of political activism, from his membership of the South African Communist Party (SACP) between 1936 and 1942 to his time in London in the early 1960s, when he had attended meetings of the Committee of African Organizations and had held "the posters up" at "anti-colonial", "anti-apartheid” and "anti-racial" meetings; in South Africa from 1939 to 1942, he had "engaged actively in Communistic propaganda"; he had fought on the Communist side in the Greek Civil War of 1947–49; and in London he had been a close associate and assistant of the ANC's local representative, Tennyson Makiwane. In short, and according to his own words, he was "anti-colonial, against slavery and in favour of all colonies which were controlled by Belgium, France and Portugal to be afforded self-government."

Nevertheless, none of these became known during a summary trial where Tsafendas escaped the death penalty on the grounds of insanity. Judge Andries Beyers ordered Tsafendas to be imprisoned indefinitely at the "State President's pleasure"; in 1999 he died aged 81 still in detention.

Legacy 

The town of Orania in the Northern Cape province houses the Verwoerd collection—memorabilia collected during Verwoerd's lifetime which is now on display in the house where his widow lived for the last years before her death in 2000 at the age of 98. Verwoerd's legacy in South Africa today is a controversial one as for black South Africans, Verwoerd was and still is regarded as the epitome of evil, the white supremacist who become a symbol of apartheid itself. Apparently, most white South Africans now speak of Verwoerd as an embarrassment and only a minority still praise him. However, in 2004 Verwoerd was elected by popular poll as one of the top 20 South Africans of all time in the TV show Great South Africans. Melanie Verwoerd, who was married to Verwoerd's grandson Willem, joined the African National Congress (ANC) (like her ex-husband). She recalled that bearing the surname Verwoerd always produced awkward stares in ANC circles when she introduced herself and she had to explain that she was indeed the granddaughter-in-law of the Verwoerd who was the prime minister.

In 1992, Verwoerd's widow, Betsie Verwoerd, moved to Orania, the Afrikaner settlement founded by her son-in-law. She was visited by the first democratically elected president of South Africa, Nelson Mandela, at her home in 1995.

On the 50th anniversary of Verwoerd's assassination in 2016, some in South Africa argued that Tsafendas should be regarded as an anti-apartheid hero.

Many major roads, places and facilities in cities and towns of South Africa were named after Verwoerd; in post-apartheid South Africa, there has been a campaign to take down statues of Verwoerd and rename buildings and streets named after him. Famous examples include H. F. Verwoerd Airport in Port Elizabeth, renamed Port Elizabeth Airport, the Verwoerd Dam in the Free State, now the Gariep Dam, H. F. Verwoerd academic hospital in Pretoria, now Steve Biko Hospital, and the town of Verwoerdburg, now Centurion.

Journalist Daniel A. Gross proposed that the campaign against Verwoerd as the "architect of apartheid" was going too far in the sense that it was too convenient to blame all the wrongs and injustices of apartheid on one man who was designated as being especially evil, stating that many people were involved in creating and maintaining the apartheid system. Gross concluded that blaming everything on Verwoerd was in effect excusing the actions of everyone else who supported apartheid.

Depiction on coins

Verwoerd is depicted on the obverses of a pair of .800 fine Silver 1 Rand coins dated 1967, which was struck to commemorate him.

Footnotes
Notes

Citations

External links

1901 births
1966 murders in South Africa
1966 deaths
Afrikaner people
Apartheid government
Assassinated heads of government
Assassinated South African politicians
Deaths by stabbing in South Africa
Dutch emigrants to South Africa
Members of the Dutch Reformed Church in South Africa
Members of the Senate of South Africa
National Party (South Africa) politicians
People murdered in South Africa
Prime Ministers of South Africa
Shooting survivors
South African anti-communists
Stellenbosch University alumni
Academic staff of Stellenbosch University